The Old Man is a 2019 Estonian animated film directed by Mikk Mägi and Oskar Lehemaa. As of 2019 this film is the most successful Estonian full-length animated film. The film was watched by over 86,000 people.

Plot

The grandchildren are coming to visit the Old Man in the country for the summer. It's far from an idyllic summer vacation at grandpa's place, because the Old Man is working hard on the land to feed both the children and his dairy cow. The rascals do not understand the customs of the countryside and cause the prized cow to run away. Now the Old Man and the kids have 24 hours to find the cow before the unmilked udder explodes and causes a dairy disaster. The old man and the children begin a merciless race against time, as the udder must be neutralized before the mysterious Old Milkman sends the cow to the heavenly meadow. On this journey, our heroes come face-to-face with hipsters who despise the countryside, lumberjacks, desperate lumberjacks and a grizzly bear suffering from constipation.

Cast
 Old Man – Mikk Mägi
 Priidik – Mikk Mägi
 Aino – Mikk Mägi
 Mart – Oskar Lehemaa
 Piimavana – Jan Uuspõld
 Cow – Märt Avandi
 Jaagup Kreem – Jaagup Kreem

References

External links
 
 The Old Man, entry in Estonian Film Database (EFIS)

2019 films
Estonian animated films